The Geiringer–Laman theorem gives a combinatorial characterization of generically rigid graphs in -dimensional Euclidean space, with respect to bar-joint frameworks.  This theorem was first proved by Hilda Pollaczek-Geiringer in 1927, and later by Gerard Laman in 1970.  An efficient algorithm called the Pebble Game is used to identify this class of graphs.  This theorem has been the inspiration for many Geiringer-Laman type results for other types of frameworks with generalized Pebble games.

Statement of the theorem 
This theorem relies on definitions of genericity that can be found on the structural rigidity page.  Let  denote the vertex set of a set of edges .

Geiringer-Laman Theorem.   A graph  is generically rigid in -dimensions with respect to bar-joint frameworks if and only if  has a spanning subgraph  such that

 
 for all subsets , .

The spanning subgraph  satisfying the conditions of the theorem is called a Geiringer-Laman, or minimally rigid, graph.  Graphs satisfying the second condition form the independent sets of a sparsity matroid, and are called -sparse.  A graph satisfying both conditions is also called a -tight graph.  The direction of the theorem which states that a generically rigid graph is -tight is called the Maxwell direction, because James Clerk Maxwell gave an analogous necessary condition of -sparsity for a graph to be independent in the -dimensional generic rigidity matroid.  The other direction of the theorem is the more difficult direction to prove.  For dimensions , a graph that is -tight is not necessarily generically minimally rigid, i.e., the converse of the Maxwell Direction is not true.

Example.  Consider the graphs in Figure 1.  The graph in (c) is generically minimally rigid, but it is not infinitesimally rigid.  The red velocity vectors depict a non-trivial infinitesimal flex.  Removing the red edge in (a) yields a generically minimally rigid spanning graph.  Adding the dashed red edge in (b) makes the graph generically minimally rigid.

Theorem.  Let  be a graph.  The following statements are equivalent:

  is a generically minimally rigid;
  is -tight; and

The equivalence of the first and second statements is the Geiringer-Laman theorem.  The equivalence of the first and third statements was first proved by, via the Geiringer-Laman theorem , and later in, via a more direct approach.

Outline of proof 
The proof of the Geiringer-Laman theorem given below is based on Laman's proof.  Furthermore, the details of the proofs below are based on lecture notes found here 

The proof of the Geiringer-Laman theorem follows the outline below.

 A graph  is generically rigid if and only if it is generically infinitesimally rigid.
 Infinitesimal rigidity is a generic property of graphs.
 Rigidity is a generic property of graphs.
 If a framework  is infinitesimally rigid, then it is rigid.
 If a framework  is generic with respect to infinitesimally rigidity and rigid, then it is infinitesimally rigid.
 If a graph  has a generic infinitesimally rigid framework, then  is a Geiringer-Laman graph.
 A graph  is a Geiringer-Laman graph if and only if  has a Henneberg construction.
 If a graph  has a Henneberg construction, then  has a generic infinitesimally rigid framework.

Step 1 sets up the generic setting of rigidity so that we can focus on generic infinitesimal rigidity rather than generic rigidity.  This is an easier approach, because infinitesimal rigidity involves a system of linear equations, rather than quadratic in the case of regular rigidity.  In particular, we can prove structural properties about the rigidity matrix of a generic framework.  These results were first proved by Asimow and Roth, see Combinatorial characterizations of generically rigid graphs.  Note that in Step 1.4 the framework must be generic with respect to infinitesimal rigidity.  In particular, a framework  that is rigid and generic with respect to rigidity is not necessarily infinitesimally rigid.  Step 2 is the Maxwell Direction of the proof, which follows from simple counting arguments on the rigidity matrix.  Step 3 shows that generically minimally rigid graphs are exactly the graphs that can be constructed starting from a single edge using two simple operations, which are defined below.  Step 4 shows that graphs with this type of construction are generically infinitesimally rigid.  Finally, once Step 1 is proved, Steps 2-3 prove the Geiringer-Laman theorem.

Equivalence of generic rigidity and generic infinitesimal rigidity 

Let  be a graph.

Proposition 1.

Proof. Finally, since  is a finite set of curves, the proposition is proved.

Proposition 2.  Infinitesimal rigidity is a generic property of graphs.

Proof.  We show that if one generic framework with respect to infinitesimal rigidity is infinitesimally rigid, then all generic frameworks are infinitesimally rigid.  If a framework  of a graph  is infinitesimally rigid, then  has max rank.  Note that the kernel of the rigidity matrix is the space of infinitesimal motions of a framework, which has dimension  for infinitesimally rigid frameworks.  Hence, by the Rank–nullity theorem, if one generic framework is infinitesimally rigid then all generic frameworks are infinitesimal rigidity have rigid.

Proposition 3.  If a framework  of a graph  is infinitesimally rigid, then it is rigid.

Proof. Applying some algebra yields:

Hence,

Hence,

The first and last expressions in the equations above state that  is an infinitesimal motion of the framework . Thus,  is not infinitesimally rigid.

Proposition 4.  If a framework  of a graph  is rigid and generic with respect to infinitesimal rigidity, then  is infinitesimally rigid.

Proof. This follows from the implicit function theorem. The set of such frameworks is still a smooth manifold, so the rigidity map and rigidity matrix can be redefined on the new domain. In this pinned setting, a framework is rigid if it is the only nearby solution to the rigidity map.

Now, assume an unpinned framework  is not infinitesimally rigid, so that . We now set up to apply the implicit function theorem. Our continuously differentiable function is the rigidity map . Denote the entries in these columns by the vectors . Denote the entries of the remaining columns by the vectors . This contradicts our assumption, so  is infinitesimally rigid.

Proposition 5.  Rigidity is a generic property of graphs.

Proof. Let  be a rigid framework of  that is generic with respect to rigidity. By Proposition 1, there is a framework  in  that is generic with respect to infinitesimal rigidity, so by Proposition 4,  is infinitesimally rigid. Hence, by Proposition 2, all frameworks that are generic with respect to infinitesimal rigidity are infinitesimally rigid, and by Proposition 3 they are also rigid. Finally, every neighborhood  of every framework  that is generic with respect to rigidity contains a framework  that is generic with respect to infinitesimal rigidity, by Proposition 1. Thus, if  is rigid then  is rigid.

Theorem 1.  A graph  is generically rigid if and only if it is generically infinitesimally rigid.

Proof.  The proof follows a similar argument to the proof of Proposition 5.  If  is generically rigid, then there exists a generic framework  with respect to rigidity that is rigid by definition.  By Propositions 1 and 4, in any neighborhood of  there is a framework  that is generic with respect to infinitesimal rigidity and infinitesimally rigid.  Hence, by Proposition 2,  is generically infinitesimally rigid.

For the other direction, assume to the contrary that  is generically infinitesimally rigid, but not generically rigid.  Then there exists a generic framework  with respect to rigidity that is not rigid by definition.  By Proposition 1, in any neighborhood of  there is a framework  that is generic with respect to infinitesimal rigidity.  By assumption  is infinitesimally rigid, and by Proposition 3,  is also rigid.  Thus,  must be rigid and, by Proposition 5, all frameworks that are generic with respect to rigidity are rigid.  This contradicts our assumption that  is not generically rigid.

Maxwell direction 
The Maxwell Direction of the Geiringer-Laman theorem follows from a simple counting argument on the rigidity matrix.

Maxwell Direction.  If a graph  has a generic infinitesimally rigid framework, then  has a Geiringer-Laman subgraph.

Proof. By definition,  has max rank, i.e.,  . In particular,  has  independent rows. Hence, which clearly satisfies .

Equivalence of generic infinitesimal rigidity and Henneberg constructions 
Now we begin the proof of the other direction of the Geiringer-Laman theorem by first showing that a generically minimally rigid graph has a Henneberg construction.  A Henneberg graph  has the following recursive definition:

  is a single edge or
  can be obtained from a Henneberg graph  via one of the following operations

The two operations above are called a -extension and a -extension respectively.

The following propositions are proved in:

Proposition 6.  A generically minimally rigid graph has no vertex with degree  and at least one vertex with degree less than 

Proposition 7.

Theorem 2.  A generically minimally rigid graph  with at least  vertices has a Henneberg construction.

Proof. We proceed by induction on the number of vertices .

Case 1:  has degree 2.

Since  is minimally rigid, we have

Hence,  is minimally rigid, by the Maxwell Direction, and  has a Henneberg construction by the inductive hypothesis. Now simply notice that  can be obtained from  via a -extension.

Case 2:  has degree 3.

Note that  cannot be an edge, or else the subgraph on just that edge satisfies the previous equality. We have

.

Furthermore, as with Case 1, any subgraph of  that does not contain  satisfies the second condition for minimal rigidity by assumption. By Proposition 7, so . Hence,  is minimally rigid, and  has a Henneberg construction by the inductive hypothesis. Finally, notice that  can be obtained from  via a -extension.

Combining Cases 1 and 2 proves the theorem by induction.

It is also easy to the converse of Theorem 2 by induction.

Proposition 8.  A graph with a Henneberg construction is generically minimally rigid.

Henneberg constructible graphs are generically infinitesimally rigid 
To complete the proof of the Geringer-Laman theorem, we show that if a graph has a Henneberg construction then it is generically infinitesimmaly rigid.  The proof of this result relies on the following proposition from.

Proposition 9.

  for all 
 The function

vanishes at every point .

Theorem 3.  If a graph  with at least  vertices has a Henneberg construction, then  is generically infinitesimally rigid.

Proof. We proceed by induction on the number of vertices . The graph in the base case  is a triangle, which is generically infinitesimally rigid. For , consider the graph  that  was obtained from via - or -extension. By the inductive hypothesis,  is generically infinitesimally rigid. Hence,  has a generic infinitesimally rigid framework  such that the kernel of  has dimension .

Case 1:  is obtained from  via a -extension.

Case 2:  is obtained from  via a -extension.

Removing the edge  from  yields the subgraph . Let  be a basis vector for the space of infinitesimal motions of  such that  is a basis for the space of trivial infinitesimal motions. Then, any infinitesimal motion of  can be written as a linear combination of these  basis vectors.

to the rigidity matrix . After rearranging, these equations have a solution if and only if

Furthermore, we can move the summation outside of the determinant to obtain

Solutions to this equation form a curve in -dimensions. We can choose  not along this curve so that , which ensures that there is only one solution to this equation.

Combining Cases 1 and 2 proves the theorem by induction.

References 

Theorems in graph theory